Phyllanthus caesiifolius is a species of plant in the family Phyllanthaceae. It is endemic to Cameroon.  Its natural habitat is subtropical or tropical moist lowland forests. It is threatened by habitat loss.

References

Endemic flora of Cameroon
caesiifolius
Critically endangered plants
Taxonomy articles created by Polbot
Taxa named by Martin Cheek